Samarn Jongsuk (born 24 March 1951) is a Thai sports shooter. He competed in the men's 10 metre air rifle event at the 1992 Summer Olympics.

References

1951 births
Living people
Samarn Jongsuk
Samarn Jongsuk
Shooters at the 1992 Summer Olympics
Place of birth missing (living people)
Samarn Jongsuk
Asian Games medalists in shooting
Shooters at the 1994 Asian Games
Shooters at the 1998 Asian Games
Medalists at the 1998 Asian Games
Samarn Jongsuk